Political Man: The Social Bases of Politics is a political science book from 1960 by Seymour Martin Lipset.

The book is an influential analysis of the bases of democracy across the world. One of the important sections is Chapter 2: "Economic Development and Democracy." Larry Diamond and Gary Marks argue that "Lipset's assertion of a direct relationship between economic development and democracy has been subjected to extensive empirical examination, both quantitative and qualitative, in the past 30 years. And the evidence shows, with striking clarity and consistency, a strong causal relationship between economic development and democracy."
In Chapter V, Lipset analyzed "Fascism"—Left, Right, and Center, and explained that the study of the social bases of different modern mass movements suggests that each major social stratum has both democratic and extremist political expressions. He explained the mistakes of identifying extremism as a right wing phenomenon, and Communism with the left wing phenomenon. He underlined that extremist ideologies and groups can be classified and analyzed in the same terms as democratic groups, i.e., right, left, and center.

The book sold more than 400,000 copies and was translated into 20 languages, including: Vietnamese, Bengali, and Serbo-Croatian.

Contents
 Contents
 Chapter I: The Sociology of Politics
 PART I: The Conditions of the Democratic Order
 Chapter II: Economic Development and Democracy
 Chapter III: Social Conflict, Legitimacy, and Democracy
 Chapter IV: Working-class Authoritarianism
 Chapter V: Fascism—Left, Right, and Center
 PART II: Voting in Western Democracies
 Chapter VI: Elections: Who Votes and Who Doesn't?
 Chapter VII: Elections: The Expression of the Democratic Class Struggle
 Chapter VIII: Elections: The Expression of the Democratic Class Struggle—Continuity and Change
 PART III: Political Behavior in American Society
 Chapter IX: Classes and Parties in American Politics
 Chapter X: American Intellectuals: Their Politics and Status
 Chapter XI: The Emergence of the One-party South—The Election of 1860
 PART IV: The Politics of Private Government: A Case Study
 Chapter XII: The Political Process in Trade-unions
 A Personal Postscript

References

Notes

1960 non-fiction books
Political books
Political science books
Doubleday (publisher) books